Krzyżanowo may refer to the following places:
Krzyżanowo, Greater Poland Voivodeship (west-central Poland)
Krzyżanowo, Masovian Voivodeship (east-central Poland)
Krzyżanowo, Pomeranian Voivodeship (north Poland)